Season 2007–08 was Clyde's eighth consecutive season in the Scottish First Division. Former Scotland captain Colin Hendry was appointed manager in June 2007, replacing Joe Miller. Hendry resigned in January 2008, and was replaced by John Brown. The club finished 9th in the division by 1 goal, and were confined to the playoffs. They staged an impressive 6–5 aggregate victory over Alloa Athletic in the Semi Final, coming from 5–2 down with 25 minutes left. They defeated Airdrie United 3–0 over two legs to regain their status as a First Division team.

Events
May
24 – Manager Joe Miller leaves the club.
26 – Forwards Andy Ferguson, Roddy Hunter & Alex Williams are released.

June
8 – Head of Youth Development Alan Upton leaves the club to join East Stirlingshire.
11 – Former Scotland captain Colin Hendry is appointed as manager. Teenage midfielder Ruari MacLennan signs a new 3-year contract.
30 – Former manager Graham Roberts wins his case for unfair dismissal.

July
18 – Defender Robert Harris joins Queen of the South after spending 3 years at Broadwood Stadium.
20 – Midfielder Brian Gilmour joins Harris at Queens after rejecting a new contract offer.
27 – Youth team graduates Kevin Bradley & David McGowan sign new contracts. Former Clyde favourite Gary Bollan is appointed Head of Youth Development.

August
2 – Colin Hendry makes his first signings. English midfielder Christian Smith, ex-Airdrie United defender Craig Potter, former Celtic youth Andrew Traub and goalkeeper David Thomson all join the club. Striker Gary Arbuckle signs a new contract.
4 – Clyde lose their opening game of the season to Greenock Morton 3–2. Clyde have a last minute equaliser controversially disallowed.
6 – Marvyn Wilson signs for the club after appearing as a trialist against Morton
7 – Clyde crash out of the League Cup in embarrassing fashion, losing to lower-league Raith Rovers 3 goals to nil.
15 – Clyde win their first game of the season, defeating Queen of the South 1–0 in the Challenge Cup.Michael Doherty becomes the youngest player ever to play for Clyde in a competitive match.
18 – Partick Thistle issue Clyde with some payback for last season with their 4–0 victory in the Glasgow Derby
25 – Clyde record their first league victory of the campaign over St Johnstone
30 – English duo Joe Cardle and Dan Kirkup join on loan from Port Vale and Carlisle United until Christmas

Transfers

Summer

In

Out

January
In:

Out:

Squad

Fixtures and results

Pre-season

Scottish First Division

Playoffs

Scottish League Cup

Scottish Challenge Cup

Scottish Cup

Reserve League Cup

Player statistics

Overall
Clyde used 33 players during the 2007–08 season, and another 3 were unused substitutes. David Hutton was the only ever-present, starting all 45 competitive matches.

League

Challenge Cup

League Cup

Scottish Cup

Note: Players in italics left the club before or during the January transfer window.

League table

Notes

 

Clyde F.C. seasons
Clyde